Tuğçe İnöntepe (born February 15, 1987 in Istanbul, Turkey) is a Turkish female basketball player. The young national plays for Mersin Büyükşehir Belediyesi on loan from Fenerbahçe Istanbul with her team-mate Tuğçe Murat.

She is 172 cm tall and plays as guard and forward. She also played 3 years for Migrosspor on loan.

See also
 Turkish women in sports

External links
Player profile at fenerbahce.org

References

1987 births
Living people
Turkish women's basketball players
Fenerbahçe women's basketball players
Mersin Büyükşehir Belediyesi women's basketball players